Three-time defending champion Novak Djokovic defeated Rafael Nadal in the final, 6–2, 6–2 to win the men's singles tennis title at the 2015 China Open. It was his sixth China Open title, and brought his record at the tournament to 29–0. He did not lose a single set in the entire tournament.

Seeds

Draw

Finals

Top half

Bottom half

Qualifying

Seeds

Qualifiers

Qualifying draw

First qualifier

Second qualifier

Third qualifier

Fourth qualifier

References

External links
 Main Draw
 Qualifying Draw

2015 China Open (tennis)